The University of Stuttgart Library (German: Universitätsbibliothek Stuttgart, also UB Stuttgart) is the central library of the University of Stuttgart, a leading research university in the south of Germany which has a strong focus on natural sciences and technical fields of study and research. It provides faculty members, researchers and students of the university's 10 faculties and 150 institutes  with literature and other resources. The library is also open to interested individuals outside the university.

Location
Since the founding of the university (until 1967 known as a Technische Hochschule) in 1829, its administrative offices have been located near the city gardens in the center of Stuttgart. Because it was not possible to expand its facilities within the city limits, a second campus was established, in 1957, in the forested area of Pfaffenwald in Stuttgart-Vaihingen, a suburb to the south-west of the city. A majority of science and engineering institutes and faculties are located on the Vaihingen campus, which today is served by a second campus library.

History
During the first years of the university, the library was an autonomous institution located in the university's main building. During the second world war a considerable portion of the collections was damaged due to bombing. In summer 1972 parts of the collections suffered significant water damage following a period of heavy rains.

In 1961 the university was able to build a dedicated facility with the help of the Max-Kade-Foundation. Planned and erected by the Stuttgart architectural firm Volkart und Zabel, the building is modelled after American academic libraries. There are notable similiarities, for example, to the reading rooms of S. Price Gilbert Memorial Library of the Georgia Institute of Technology. Due to subsequent developments in library operations over the past 60 years, the library today faces significant space and structural problems. In 2018 the library building was added to the list of cultural heritage sites in the state of Baden-Württemberg.

Between the years 1957 and 1973 the city campus provided library services to both campus locations of the university with only one central collection. The library administration, including media processing and inter-library loan, are still conducted on the city campus for libraries on both campuses.

In 1973 a second library facility was established in Stuttgart-Vaihingen. It is located in the natural sciences center, one of the campus's original buildings, and has been expanded several times. The library has a number of reading rooms, freely accessible shelving areas and also a closed-stacks section. The reading rooms are located on six floors. The six reading rooms are located on three floors of the building. In addition, there are two branch libraries on the Vaihingen campus which are directly administered by their respective faculties. Two other faculty libraries are operated cooperatively with their faculties.

In 2017 the university library established modern learning centers (German=Lernwelte) on both campuses. These offer modern workspaces for individuals and groups, as well as meeting rooms equipped for presentations. In 2018 the opening hours were extended to midnight and to a seven-day week (except during holidays). In the same year the library became an active participant in the university's "Competence Center for Research Data Management" (German: FoKUS).

Statistics
The library OPAC includes all of the library holdings, but retrospective cataloging of some institute libraries is still in progress.

 Total holdings: 1,651,544
 E-Books: 148,406
 Current journal subscriptions (print): 924
 E-journals: 30,442
 Seating: 1.311
 Visits per year: 62,991
 Borrowing users: 17,081
 Annual budget: 3,166,473 € (incl. 2,925,669 € for digital media)
 Days open per year: 276
 Library instruction (participants): 1,396
 Hours of library instruction: 142
Source: Website of the university library, 2021 and Deutsche Bibliotheksstatistik (DBS)

Library catalogue
Since 1996 the central library collection has been accessible through an OPAC, which replaced all card catalogues. Retrospective cataloguing of departmental and institute library holdings is not yet completed. The majority of the collection can be searched by subject terms.

In addition, the library's holdings can be searched through the Union Catalogue of the Stuttgart-Tübingen Region, which includes the holdings of three other large libraries (the State Library of Württemberg and the libraries of the University of Hohenheim and the University of Tübingen), as well as many other technical or applied science universities, colleges and special libraries.  At the time of its founding in 1996 the regional OPAC included 1.3 million titles. The regional catalog is an integral part of the Southwest German Library Consortium (SWB).

The SWB, and thus the university library catalogue, can be searched with the Germany-based international search engine Karlsruher Virtueller Katalog (KVK).

Digital Services
Digital Collection of the University Library
The first digitalized items from the university collection became available in October 2015.  The platform uses the open-source software Goobi. These digital documents, such as architectural drawings, are rendered in high image resolution.

OPUS
OPUS is a repository platform for open-access scientific publications. Originally, OPUS was the acronym for Online Publikationsverbund der Universität Stuttgart. It was developed by the University of Stuttgart's library computer center in 1997–1998 with the support of the German Research Network (German: Deutsches Forschungsnetz (DFN). In 2016 the university library shifted over to an alternative document server, DSpace, which is used by other university libraries around the world, but the brand-name OPUS remains in use.

Upon introduction this digital archive comprised 8725 publications. In the 2015 Open Access Repository Ranking (OARR) OPUS held rank 68 among the 180 repositories based in German-speaking countries.

PUMA
In October 2015 the university library adopted  the German publications management system named PUMA for the management of bookmarks and citations. The online system uses the open-source software BibSonomy and is accessible to everyone associated with the university. This service is used for the compilation of individual publication lists. The university also supports use of Citavi through its campus-wide license.

University bibliography
In 2016 the university published a bibliography generated by the online database within PUMA.  It serves to monitor the extent of open-access publications issued throughout the university.

Journal hosting
Researchers at the university have the opportunity and tools to host peer-reviewed, open-access academic journals through the university library using the Open Journal Systems (OJS) software. Since 2013 the Journal of Technical Education (JOTED) and since 2021 the Journal of Competences, Strategy & Management (JCSM) have been hosted within this framework.

 Decentralised library network 
The main library provides advisory services to the 121 individual departmental or subject libraries within the university system. For small libraries with no professional staff or no direct input to the regional union catalogue, the cataloguing department of the main library provides cataloguing services and updates holding records. Subject librarians advise these libraries about planned acquisitions and help coordinate system-wide decisions in order to keep duplication of holdings to a minimum.

 Publications 
Library services and activities at the university and in other Stuttgart libraries, as well as commemorative events at the university are announced and documented through the publication of flyers, brochures and books.

Twice a year the university library publishes a record of the doctoral and Habilitation theses completed at the University of Stuttgart. This is used as the basis for its gifts and exchange programme (German: Schriftentausch) and also serves as a cornerstone of the university bibliography. Since 2015 the semi-annual listing has been made available on the library's website.

The publication series Bibliotheken – Bildung und Fortschritt (Libraries – Education and Progress) documents current issues of librarianship. Announcements of training courses, library events, services and other library programmes are issued through flyers and brochures.

On behalf of the office of the university rector the university library publishes a series of booklets in conjunction with academic festivities and commemorative events.

Up until 2009 (8th edition) the university library issued a printed guide to the libraries in metropolitan Stuttgart which included information about the holdings and accessibility of both public and academic libraries, special libraries, college and university libraries, archives, museums, governmental libraries, company and church-related libraries, as well as other less well-known institutions.

 IZUS 
The Informations- und Kommunikationszentrum der Universität Stuttgart (IZUS) is the umbrella institution, under which the university library is a subordinate organisation. The IZUS comprises two areas with clearly defined competencies and responsibilities: 
•	the library system of the University of Stuttgart, which consists of the central library and the libraries of all affiliated institutes
•	the technical  information and communication services of the university (TIK), which include computer servers and digital networks for communication

 References 

 Literature 
 Christiane Rambach, Frank Wiatrowski: Cultural Monument University of Stuttgart Library. Functional. Flexible. Transparent, Universitätsbibliothek Stuttgart 2020, doi:10.18419/opus-11203
 Christiane Rambach, Universitätsbibliothek Stuttgart, in: Stadtarchiv Stuttgart (Hg): Digitales Stadtlexikon, published 23 June 2022.
 Werner Stephan (ed.): 50 Jahre Neubau Universitätsbibliothek Stuttgart 2011. bearbeitet von Christiane Rambach, Ottmar Pertschi, Stuttgart 2011, ISBN 978-3-926269-33-1.
 
 , Format: PDF
 
 
 

 External links 

 
 Übersicht über die dezentralen Fachbibliotheken der Universität (Stuttgart)
 Katalog des Bibliothekssystems der Universität Stuttgart''
 Regionalkatalog Stuttgart-Tübingen
 Akademisches Publikationsmanagement (PUMA)
 Universität Stuttgart – Open Access
 Dokumentenserver OPUS
 IZUS: Informations- und Kommunikationszentrum IZUS

University of Stuttgart
Libraries in Stuttgart
Educational institutions established in 1829
Academic libraries in Germany
Libraries established in 1829